The siege of Château Gaillard was a part of Philip II's campaign to conquer John, King of England's continental properties. The French king besieged Château Gaillard, a Norman fortress, for six months. The Anglo-Normans were beaten in the battle and the consequence was the fall of Normandy.

Dispositions
King Philip wished to take control of Normandy. The castle at Château Gaillard was the key to the campaign, but he did not move against it directly. Instead he attacked a number of lesser castles in the surrounding area, effectively isolating Château Gaillard and ensuring that his operations were not threatened by nearby forces. Having done as much as possible to prevent the relief of the castle, Philip then set about reducing it by siege. It would be a slow process, for Château Gaillard was a powerful fortress. The defenders were of course tied to their base, the castle. They could come out to make local counterattacks, but for the most part they had to simply remain within the defenses and try to counter the moves that Philip made. The Anglo-Normans took the precaution of destroying the bridge, making a river crossing difficult. Philip's forces first filled the ditch and broke through the palisade that defended it. This gave access to the castle proper, and it was necessary before any real operations could be undertaken. A bridge of boats, defended by ingenious floating towers mounted on boats, was set up to allow the French army to move back and forth. With his communications secure and access to the castle now gained, Philip began the work of reducing its defenses so if wars happened they would fortake in easier battles for themselves.

Relief attempts
The English sent two forces to relieve the castle. Under cover of darkness, one force was to row up the river and destroy the bridge of boats, which would cut the French forces in two. Meanwhile, a land force under William the Marshal was to attack one part of the French army which, with their backs to the river and unable to retreat, could be destroyed. The relief went awry. The land attack was completely successful at first, but the French were able to retreat over the bridge of boats, as the river assault had not arrived in time. In addition to troops and crews, the boats were heavily laden with supplies for the garrison, and took much longer than planned to row upstream against current and tide. The French were thus able to re-group and counter-attack, driving off the Anglo-Norman land forces. By the time the boats reached the bridge, the French were ready for them, and drove them off with considerable loss. John then abandoned his attempt to raise the siege. One contemporary chronicler states that he was twenty miles away before the rest of his army realised he'd gone.

Preparations
Even in the medieval period, the successful application of technology allowed a small force to achieve results out of proportion to the size of the unit. The tool in this case was Greek fire, a mixture of naphtha, pitch, and other ingredients that burst into flames when exposed to air. Strapping a number of clay canisters of flammable material to his body, a Frenchman named Galbert was able to swim to the island behind the castle and place his charges. The resulting inferno enabled the French to storm the island and complete the isolation of the castle. The siege was going to be a long one, so Philip had housing in the form of crude huts for his troops. He ordered that the trenches he dug to defend the camp and that a "covered way" be set up to allow his men to approach the castle without danger. Philip set up his siege engines in prepared positions. He ordered that the tops of the hills be leveled off to provide good emplacements for them. These threw heavy rocks at the Anglo-Normans. Meanwhile, Roger de Lacy was concerned that his supplies might not last until a new relief effort could be mounted. He therefore sent all non-combatants out of the castle. In some ways this might be a merciful gesture, but it was also good sense, in that it meant several hundred fewer people to feed. At first the French let the refugees through their siege lines, but after a time began to refuse them passage. The result was several hundred people ended up trapped between the besiegers and the castle as siege engines and archers exchanged fire over their heads. There they remained for some time, starving until Philip relented and gave them food. His men let them through the lines and they dispersed. King John of England made another attempt to break the siege, this time by raiding Brittany to draw off the French. But Philip declined to give up his hard work to chase the English around the countryside, and remained where he was. Disheartened, King John took a ship for England and did not return. Throughout the winter of 1203/1204, the defenders made do with what they had as Philip's men received more supplies. They built belfries, mobile structures designed to protect men while they used rams or other equipment to attack walls and gates. By February, the first assault was ready.

The siege

The outer bailey falls 

In order to get to the bailey, it was necessary to either breach the walls or open a gate. The latter was not likely, though it was possible to eventually batter through one. Philip's assault came from several directions. While siege engines and archers caused casualties on the walls, other engines and archers caused casualties among the defenders on the walls themselves, covered by belfries with a thick sloping roof to protect the men working inside. Miners worked to undermine the walls. There were many dangers, ranging from early collapse of the tunnel to counter-mining by the enemy, which would result in a desperate close-quarters battle for possession of the tunnels. Philip's assault on the outer bailey also included the most basic of castle assault techniques: escalade. Foot soldiers ran up to the walls with ladders, and began to climb them. Unfortunately, the ladders were too short. Men were under attack by the wall guards, unable to move due to the person behind them. Some of the attackers were able to create footholds in the stonework, and some of them gained the wall. There was bitter hand-to-hand fighting. More men came up the walls. As more Frenchmen gained the outer bailey, it became obvious it could not be held. Those of the defenders who could flee back to the inner bailey prepared themselves for a new assault.

The inner bailey falls
The cost in time and lives to gain the outer bailey had been high, but Philip was prepared for this. He decided to attack the last position; the second bailey. Philip's men climbed up a garderobe (toilet chute) and entered the chapel above. They then let their fellow soldiers into the central bailey, which was captured. The inner bailey was surrounded by a moat, crossed by a natural rock bridge. Using the bridge as cover, the French took the inner bailey. The forces of King John surrendered on March 6, 1204.

Aftermath
Having captured Château Gaillard, Philip launched a campaign into English-held territory. Plantagenet prestige and morale had suffered badly. They had lost their fine castles, and their relief attempt had resulted in total defeat. Normandy did not put up much of a fight, and Philip then took Rouen and pushed on all the way to the coast.  His campaign gained him several principalities, including Anjou and Touraine. Plantagenet holdings in France were diminishing. Château Gaillard's commander, Roger de Lacy, returned to England to begin work reinforcing his own castle at Pontefract. In England, where King John was already unpopular, the fall of Château Gaillard meant the loss of even more prestige. A king who could not even keep control of his own castles and failed to come to the assistance of loyal lords holding out under siege in his name was considered a weak king. It is likely that the humiliation of Château Gaillard played a part in the decision of English barons to challenge King John. That in turn led to one of the most important events in English history: the sealing of Magna Carta.

References

1203 in Europe
1204 in Europe
1200s in France
Military history of Normandy
Château Gaillard
Château Gaillard
Philip II of France
John, King of England
Château Gaillard
Château Gaillard